Florentino García Martínez (born 1942, in Mochales or Madrid) is a former Catholic priest, now married and for many years professor of religion and theology at the University of Groningen in the Netherlands. He is a leading expert on messianic ideas in the Dead Sea scrolls.

He is responsible for the standard translation of the Dead Sea Scrolls along with Eibert Tigchelaar: The Dead Sea Scrolls: Study Edition, 2 Volumes, (Leiden/Grand Rapids: Brill/Eerdmans, 1997 & 1998).

García Martínez has put forward an analysis of the material regarding the Wicked Priest found columns 8 to 12 of the Habakkuk Commentary known as the Groningen hypothesis.

García Martínez became a foreign member of the Royal Netherlands Academy of Arts and Sciences in 2004.

Publications
Among García Martínez's more recent publications are:
 Echoes from the Caves: Qumran and the New Testament. (García Martínez, F., Ed.). (Leiden/Boston: Brill, 2009).
 Defining Identities. We, You, and the Other in the Dead Sea Scrolls. (Garcia Martinez, F., Ed.). (Leiden: Brill, 2008).
 Wisdom and apocalypticism in the Dead Sea Scrolls and in the biblical tradition. (Garcia Martinez, F., Ed.). (Leuven: Peeters, 2003).

Sources
 Knighthood announcement

References

1942 births
Living people
20th-century Spanish Roman Catholic theologians
Dead Sea Scrolls
Academic staff of the University of Groningen
Members of the Royal Netherlands Academy of Arts and Sciences
People from the Province of Guadalajara
20th-century Dutch Roman Catholic theologians
21st-century Dutch Roman Catholic theologians